The Zenith STOL CH 801 is a four-seat sport STOL aircraft developed by Chris Heintz and available in kit form from the Zenith Aircraft Company.

Design and development
The CH 801 is based on the general design and features of the smaller two-place STOL CH 701 model. While both aircraft look alike they do not share any common parts.

The STOL CH 801 is made from sheet aluminium and employs a deep wing chord, full-length leading edge slots and trailing edge flaperons to develop high lift at low speed, while maintaining a short wing-span for maximum strength and ground maneuverability.

By the end of 2011 160 CH 801s had been completed and were flying.

Specifications (CH 801)

References

External links

 Zenith Aircraft

1990s Canadian civil utility aircraft
Homebuilt aircraft
CH 801
Zenith aircraft
Single-engined tractor aircraft
High-wing aircraft
STOL aircraft